The 1967 European Rowing Championships were rowing championships held on Lake Allier, a reservoir in the Allier River adjacent to the French city of Vichy. This edition of the European Rowing Championships was held from 1 to 3 September for women, and from 7 to 10 September for men. Women entered in five boat classes (W1x, W2x, W4x+, W4+, W8+), and 14 countries sent 40 boats. For the first time, a women's team from outside Europe attended the championships, with the USA sending two boats. Men competed in all seven Olympic boat classes (M1x, M2x, M2-, M2+, M4-, M4+, M8+), and 24 or 25 countries (sources vary) sent 113 boats. Three non-European countries sent some (male) rowers: the United States, Australia, and New Zealand.

Medal summary – women's events
Just six boats were nominated for the eight event, meaning that the six teams (East Germany, the Soviet Union, the Netherlands, Romania, and Czechoslovakia) proceeded straight to the final. Heats and semi-finals were held for the other four boat classes as needed. The woman competed over a 1,000 m distance at the time.

Medal summary – men's events
The regatta for men was opened in the presence of François Missoffe, the French minister for youths and sport. No country qualified all their seven boats for the finals. East Germany, West Germany, and the United States had six of their boats in the finals, and the Soviet Union had qualified five boats. East Germany was the most successful nation, with five of their six finalists winning medals, including two gold. Achim Hill, who after winning single scull gold was looking back over a long rowing career, commented that "as an old men, I'm having a second spring". Denmark was one of the finalists in the coxless pair but did not start as their stroke had fallen ill. During the finals, the first and the last race were photo finishes for the silver medals. In the coxed four race, East Germany narrowly beat Romania for silver, with the Soviet Union taking gold. In the men's eight, traditionally the last race, West Germany won its only gold medal. The United States was just 0.03 seconds ahead of the Soviet Union for second place.

Medals table 
The table shows the aggregate results for men and women. The overall winner was East Germany with four and five gold and silver medals, respectively. The Soviet Union came a close second with the same number of gold medals, but just two silver medals, plus two bronze medals. A total of eleven countries won medals.

References

European Rowing Championships
European Rowing Championships
Rowing
Rowing
Europe